The Olympus C-730UZ is a digital camera manufactured by Olympus. It was first released in 2002.

Features and lens 
The UZ in the camera's name refers to Ultra Zoom; 10 times zoom being a significant increase over the more standard three times zoom capability of standard digital cameras.
The lens is an Olympus aspherical glass zoom lens 5.9–59 mm.  The 10x zoom  is equivalent to 38–380 mm in 35 mm photography.  The specifications describe it as a "multivariator 2 aspherical glass 10x zoom".

Flash 

The camera has a built-in manual pop-up flash.

Movies 

Movies can be recorded with sound and the recording time is dependent on the memory card capacity. They are in QuickTime (.mov) format.

Power source 

The camera can use AA batteries (4) including rechargeable batteries.  Alternatively it also takes two LB-01(CR-V3) lithium batteries.

Images

Sample Images

References 

C-730
Cameras introduced in 2002